Friedrich Georg "Fritz" Houtermans (January 22, 1903 – March 1, 1966) was a Dutch-Austrian-German atomic and nuclear physicist and Communist born in Zoppot (now Sopot) near Danzig (now Gdańsk), West Prussia to a Dutch father, who was a wealthy banker. He was brought up in Vienna, where he was educated, and moved to Göttingen when he was 18 to study. It was in Göttingen where he obtained his Ph.D. under James Franck.

Education
Houtermans began his studies at the University of Göttingen in 1921, and he received his doctorate under James Franck in 1927, the same year Robert Oppenheimer received his doctorate under Max Born. He completed his Habilitation under Gustav Hertz at the Technical University of Berlin, in 1932. Hertz and Franck were Nobel Prize laureates; they shared the 1925 Nobel Prize in Physics.

While at Göttingen, Houtermans met Enrico Fermi, George Gamow, Werner Heisenberg, Wolfgang Pauli, and Victor Frederick Weisskopf.  Houtermans and Gamow did pioneering work on quantum tunneling in 1928.  Houtermans, in 1929, with Robert d'Escourt Atkinson, made the first calculation of stellar thermonuclear reactions. Their pioneering calculations were the impetus for Carl Friedrich von Weizsäcker and Hans Bethe, in 1939, to put forth the correct theory of stellar thermonuclear energy generation.

Charlotte Riefenstahl, who received her doctorate in physics at the University of Göttingen in 1927, the same year as Houtermans and Robert Oppenheimer, was courted by both men. She was no relation to Leni Riefenstahl, the notable German filmmaker. In 1930, she left her teaching position at Vassar College and went back to Germany.  During a physics conference at the Black Sea resort of Batumi, Riefenstahl and Houtermans were married in August 1930, in Tbilisi, with Wolfgang Pauli and Rudolf Peierls as witnesses to the ceremony. (Three other references cite the year as being 1931.)

Career
From 1932 to 1933, Houtermans taught at the Technical University of Berlin and was an assistant to Hertz.  While there, he met Patrick Blackett, Max von Laue, and Leó Szilárd.

Houtermans was a Communist; he had been a member of the German Communist Party since the 1920s. After the election of Adolf Hitler in 1933, Charlotte Houtermans insisted that they leave Germany. They went to Great Britain, near Cambridge, where he worked for the EMI (Electrical and Musical Instruments, Ltd.) Television Laboratory. In 1935 Houtermans emigrated to the Soviet Union, as the result of a proposal by Alexander Weissberg, who had emigrated to there in 1931. Houtermans took an appointment at the Kharkov Physico-Technical Institute and worked there for two years with the Russian physicist Valentin P. Fomin.  In the Great Purge, Houtermans was arrested by the NKVD in December 1937.  He was tortured and confessed to being a Trotskyist plotter and German spy, out of fear from threats against Charlotte. However, Charlotte had already escaped from the Soviet Union to Denmark, after which she went to England and finally the USA.  After the Hitler-Stalin Pact of 1939, Houtermans was turned over to the Gestapo in May 1940 and imprisoned in Berlin. Through efforts of Max von Laue, Houtermans was released in August 1940, whereupon he became employed Forschungslaboratorium für Elektronenphysik, a private laboratory of Manfred Baron von Ardenne, in Lichterfelde, a suburb of Berlin. In 1944, Houtermans took a position as a nuclear physicist at the Physikalisch-Technische Reichsanstalt.

While imprisoned in the Soviet Union, a cellmate of Houtermans was the Kiev University historian Konstantin Shteppa.  They would later write a book together, Russian Purge and the Extraction of Confession, under the pseudonyms of Beck and Godin to protect their many friends and colleagues back in the USSR.

At the Forschunsinstitut Manfred von Ardenne, Houtermans showed that transuranic isotopes, such as neptunium and plutonium, could be used as fissionable fuels in substitution for uranium. In an act of espionage against his country, Houtermans sent a telegram from Switzerland to Eugene Wigner at the Met Lab warning the USA's Manhattan Project of German work on fission: "Hurry up. We are on the track."

During Houtermans's employment at the Physikalisch-Technische Reichsanstalt (PTR), he got himself into serious trouble as a result of his habit of being a chain-smoker and suffering great distress if he did not have a supply of tobacco.  On official PTR stationery, he wrote to a Dresden cigarette manufacturer to obtain a kilogram of Macedonian tobacco, claiming that he could extract heavy water from the tobacco, and thus that it was "kriegswichtig", i.e., important for the war effort. When he had smoked the tobacco, he again wrote for more, however, the letter fell into the hands of an official at the PTR, who had him fired.  Werner Heisenberg and Carl Weizsäcker came to the rescue of Houtermans and arranged an interview for him with Walter Gerlach, the plenipotentiary (Bevollmächtiger) for German nuclear research under the Reich Research Council. As a result, Houtermans moved to Göttingen in 1945, where Hans Kopferman and Richard Becker got him positions at the Institut für Theoretische Physik and II. Physikalisches Institut der Universität Göttingen.

From 1952, Houtermans took a position as ordinarius professor of physics at the University of Bern. During his tenure there, he founded Berner Schule, whose thrust was the application of radioactivity to astrophysics, cosmochemistry, and geosciences.

Personal
Houtermans was married four times. Charlotte was his first and third wife in four marriages. They had two children, a daughter Giovanna (born in Berlin, 1932) and a son Jan (born in Kharkov, 1935), and they were divorced the first time in 1943, due to a new law in Germany and enforced wartime separation. In February 1944, Houtermans married Ilse Bartz, a chemical engineer; they worked together during the war and published a paper. Houtermans and Ilse had three children, Pieter, Elsa, and Cornelia.  In August 1953, again with Pauli standing as a witness, Charlotte and Houtermans were again married, but they divorced again in only a few months. In 1955, Houtermans married Lore Müller, sister of his stepbrother, Hans. She brought her four-year-old daughter to the marriage, and she and Houtermans had a son, Hendrik, born in 1956.

Houtermans died of lung cancer on 1 March 1966.

Internal report
Reports in this publication were classified Top Secret, they had very limited distribution, and the authors were not allowed to keep copies. The reports were confiscated under the Allied Operation Alsos and sent to the United States Atomic Energy Commission for evaluation. In 1971, the reports were declassified and returned to Germany. The reports are available at the Karlsruhe Nuclear Research Center and the American Institute of Physics.

Fritz Houtermans .  G-94.

Works (selection)
Atkinson, R. and Houtermans, F.G. "Aufbaumöglichkeit in Sternen" (Z. für Physik 54, 656-665, 1929)
Houtermans, F.G. "Über ein neues Verfahren zur Durchführung chemischer Altersbestimmungen nach der Blei-Methode" (Springer, 1951)
Houtermans, Fritz "Publikationen von Friedrich Georg Houtermans aus den Jahren 1926-1950" (Zusammengestellt im Physikalischen Institut Universität Bern, 1955)
Geiss, J. and E. D. Goldberg and F. G. Houtermans "Earth Science and Meteoritics- dedicated to F. G. Houtermans on his sixtieth birthday F.G. Houtermans" (North Holland, 1963)

For a partial list of works by Houtermans, see the Wolfram biography.

See also
Directed-energy weapon
Excimer laser
Stellar nucleosynthesis
ZETA (fusion reactor)

Notes

Sources
Beck, F. and Godin, W. "Russian Purge and the Extraction of Confession" (Hurst and Blackett, 1951). Houtermans and Konstantine F. Shteppa, the authors of this book, took the pseudonyms Beck and Godin to protect their many friends and colleagues back in the USSR.
Amaldi, E. “The Adventurous Life of Friedrich Georg Houtermans, Physicist (1903-1966)”, S. Braccini, A. Ereditato, P. Scampoli Eds. (SpringerBriefs in Physics, 2010)

Further reading

Bernstein, Jeremy, Hitler's Uranium Club: The Secret Recordings at Farm Hall (Copernicus, 2001) 
Buttlar, H. von, "Leonium und andere Anekdoten um den Physikprofessor Dr. F. G. Houtermans" (Bochum, 1982)
Bird, Kai and Martin J. Sherwin, American Promethius: The Triumph and Tragedy of J. Robert Oppenheimer (Vintage, 2005)
 Frenkel, Viktor, Professor Houtermans, Works, Life, Fate (biography in Russian), (Academy of Sciences, St. Petersburg, 1997)
Frisch, Otto Robert, What Little I Remember (Cambridge, 1980)
Gamow, George, My World Line: An Informal Autobiography (Viking, 1970) 
Hentschel, Ann M. "The Physical Tourist: Peripatetic Highlights in Bern", Physics in Perspective, Volume 7, Number 1, 107-129 (2005).  The author is cited as being at the Wissenschaftstheorie und Wissenschaftsgeschichte, University of Bern, Uni-Tobler, Länggassstrasse 49a, CH-3012 Bern 9, Switzerland.
Hentschel, Klaus (editor) and Ann M. Hentschel (editorial assistant and translator) Physics and National Socialism: An Anthology of Primary Sources (Birkhäuser, 1996) 
Houtermans, F. "Determination of the Age of the Earth from the Isotopic Composition of Meteoritic Lead", Nuovo Cimento, 10 1623-1633 (1953)
Jungk, Robert, Brighter Than a Thousand Suns (Harcourt, Brace, 1958)
Khriplovich, Iosif B.  "The Eventful Life of Fritz Houtermans", Physics Today, Volume 45, Issue 7,  29 – 37 (1992). The author is cited as being at the Gersh Budker Institute of Nuclear Physics in Novosibirsk, Russia, and professor at the Novosibirsk University.
Landrock, Konrad, "Friedrich Georg Houtermans (1903–1966) – Ein bedeutender Physiker des 20. Jahrhunderts", Naturwissenschaftliche Rundschau, Volume 56, Number 4, 187 – 199 (2003)
Marvin, U.B. "Oral histories in meteoritics and planetary sciences: VIII Friedrich Begemann", Meteoritics & Planetary Science, 37, B69-B77 (2002)
Patterson, C.  "Age of meteorites and the Earth", Geochimica et Cosmochimica Acta, 10 230-237 (1956)
Powers, Thomas, Heisenberg's War: The Secret History of the German Bomb (Knopf, 1993) 
Rhodes, Richard, The Making of the Atomic Bomb (Simon and Schuster, 1986) 
Walker, Mark, German National Socialism and the Quest for Nuclear Power 1939–1949 (Cambridge, 1993) 
Wigner, Eugene P. and Andrew Szanton. The Recollections of Eugene P. Wigner as told to Andrew Szanton (Plenum, 1992)

External links

Annotated Bibliography for Fritz Hourtermans from the Alsos Digital Library for Nuclear Issues
Biography with a list of published works - Wolfram
Fritz Houtermans - Österreichische Akademie der Wissenschaften
Konrad Landrock - Friedrich Georg Houtermans (1903–1966) – Ein bedeutender Physiker des 20. Jahrhunderts

1903 births
1966 deaths
German communists
German nuclear physicists
Deaths from lung cancer
People from West Prussia
People from Sopot
University of Göttingen alumni
Technical University of Berlin alumni
Academic staff of the Technical University of Berlin
Nuclear program of Nazi Germany
German people imprisoned abroad
Prisoners and detainees of the Soviet Union
Refugees from Nazi Germany in the Soviet Union
20th-century  German physicists
German emigrants to the Netherlands